Rogan's Shoes is a family-owned shoe store headquartered in Racine, Wisconsin. It operates 29 stores in three Midwestern states: Illinois, Minnesota, and Wisconsin.

History
Rogan's Shoes was founded in 1971 with its first store in Racine, Wisconsin. The chain expanded into the neighboring states of Iowa, Illinois, and Minnesota. Rogan's launched it initial website in 2000 and began selling products online in 2004. The company stayed out of large metropolitan markets until 2008, when it opened a store in the greater Milwaukee area.

Founder Jack Rogan had 11 children and many are still involved with the business.

Charitable endeavors 
Rogan's has teamed up with name brand Skechers to help distribute shoes to low-income areas served by Rogan's locations, including Racine and Kenosha, Wisconsin.

Legal issues 
In 2010 customers filed a class-action lawsuit against the company for printing expiration dates of credit cards on receipts, a violation of the Fair and Accurate Credit Transactions Act. Rogan Shoes eventually settled with the lawsuit plaintiff and the class for $16 million, but not in cash, or at least not Rogan Shoes’ cash. The settlement agreement specified that the judgment would be satisfied only through proceeds from Rogan Shoes’ insurance policies, with the exception of an up-front cash payment by Rogan Shoes of $50,000 to cover the named plaintiff's legal costs. As part of the settlement agreement, Rogan Shoes assigned to the plaintiffs all of its “claims against and rights to payments from” its insurer under the policies.

References

External links
 Rogan's Shoes website

Shoe companies of the United States
Companies based in Racine, Wisconsin
1971 establishments in Wisconsin
Retail companies established in 1971